Dawn of Man is a survival and city-building video game which was developed by Madruga Works. The closed beta started the week of October 17, 2018 and the game was released on March 1, 2019.

Gameplay
In Dawn of Man, players have to lead a group of prehistoric settlers who are trying to form a settlement and ensure their survival from the Paleolithic era until the Iron Age. Players build and develop a settlement where their settlers can survive and have a constant supply of food, water, and clothing. They are responsible for guiding their settlers to create a self-sufficient settlement where they can extract resources easily and hunt food for living. Players also have to survive natural disasters such as blizzards and storms, use weapons to fend off raiders and defend their settlement from animal attacks.

Reception 
On Metacritic, the game has an aggregated score of 74/100 based on 9 critic reviews, indicating "mixed or average reviews".

See also
Planetbase
Banished

References

External links
Official website

2019 video games
Indie video games
MacOS games
PlayStation 4 games
Prehistoric people in popular culture
Simulation video games
Single-player video games
Video games with Steam Workshop support
Strategy video games
Video games developed in the United Kingdom
Video games set in prehistory
Windows games
Xbox One games